The Huanghai Aurora (翱龙, Aolong) is a mid-size SUV  manufactured by Huanghai Auto of SG Automotive (曙光汽车) from 2007 to 2012 and marketed from 2006 until 2010.

Overview 

Code named DD6470N, the Huanghai Aurora was marketed as a CUV despite being essentially a truck-based SUV with styling heavily inspired by the first generation SsangYong Rexton SUV.  Prices of the Huanghai Aurora ranges from 79,800 to 106,800 yuan.

References

External links 

 SG Automotive official site

Aurora
Cars introduced in 2006
Mid-size sport utility vehicles